2 Unlimited is the debut studio album by French avant-garde metal band Pin-Up Went Down, released on 28 March 2008 through Ascendance Records.

Track listing

Critical reception
The album has been well received by the critics and the public alike. AGM webzine, in a positive review, has praised Asphodel's and Alexis Damien's vocals, the album's ever-changing musical direction and its lyrics, ending their review stating "it's one of the most promising first-time debut releases of all time of avant-garde music. Not joking".

It has a 17 out 20 approval rate at Spirit of Metal.

Personnel
 Aurélie Raidron (Asphodel) – vocals, photography, cover art
 Alexis Damien – vocals, guitars, bass, keyboards, piano, drums, production

References

External links
 Pin-Up Went Down's official website

2008 debut albums
Pin-Up Went Down albums